The Front for Change/Social Pole (Spanish: Frente para el Cambio/Polo Social) is a progressive political party in Argentina. 

At the 2005 legislative elections, sections of the party joined the Encuentro Amplio with other left-wing parties in Buenos Aires and Buenos Aires Province. The coalition did badly and lost its existing national representation.

Left-wing parties in Argentina